Land Registration Act may refer to three Acts of Parliament in the United Kingdom:

 Land Registration Act 1925
 Land Registration Act 1936, amending the 1925 Act
 Land Registration Act 2002, superseding the 1925 and 1936 Acts

See also
 Land Registry Act 1862, an initial attempt at land registration